Bhakra Nangal Dam is a concrete gravity dam on the Satluj River in Bhakra Village near Bilaspur in Bilaspur district, Himachal Pradesh in northern India.  The dam forms the Gobind Sagar reservoir.

The dam, located at a gorge near the (now submerged) upstream Bhakra village in Bilaspur district of Himachal Pradesh of height 226 m.  The length of the dam (measured from the road above it) is 518.25 m and the width is 9.1 m. Its reservoir known as "Gobind Sagar" stores up to 9.34 billion cubic metres of water. The 90 km long reservoir created by the Bhakra Dam is spread over an area of 168.35 km2. In terms of quantity of water, it is the third largest reservoir in India, the first being Indira Sagar dam  in Madhya Pradesh with capacity of 12.22 billion cubic meters and second Nagarjunasagar Dam.

Described as "New Temple of Resurgent India" by Jawaharlal Nehru, the first prime minister of India, the dam attracts tourists from all over India. Bhakra dam is 15 km from Nangal town, Punjab and 106 km from Bilaspur

Nangal Dam is another dam in Punjab downstream of Bhakra Dam. However, sometimes both the dams together are called Bhakra-Nangal Dam though they are two separate dams.

History

The Bhakra-Nangal multipurpose dams were among the earliest river valley development schemes undertaken by India after independence though the project had been conceived long before India became a free nation. The agreement for this project had been signed by the then Punjab Revenue Minister, Sir Chhotu Ram in November 1944 with Raja of Bilaspur and finalised the project plan on 8 January 1945. Preliminary works commenced in 1946. Construction of the dam started in 1948; Jawaharlal Nehru poured the first bucket of concrete into the dry riverbed of the Sutlej on 17 November 1955, as a symbolic initiation of the work. Addressing a gathering there, he said, "This is a gift to the people of India and to the future generations from the workers who built this dam", calling for "raising a memorial" at the dam "in honour" of the workers. The dam was completed by the end of 1963. Successive stages were completed by the early 1970s.

Initially, the construction of the dam was started by Sir Louis Dane, the Lieutenant Governor of Punjab. But the project got delayed and was restarted soon after independence under the chief architect Rai Bahadur Kunwar Sen Gupta. It was financed entirely by the union government. The Control Board for the project included representatives from union government, and of the governments of Punjab, Patiala and East Punjab States Union, Rajasthan, Bilaspur and Himachal Pradesh. The organisation evolved for the purpose of design and construction was divided into three parts. The Designs Directorate provided the designs and drawings. The Construction and Plant Design Directorate was to look after its execution and installing of the plant, while the Directorate of Inspection and Control ensured that the specifications are accorded to safety requirements were met.

In October 1963, at the ceremony to mark the dedication of the Bhakra–Nangal project to the nation, Prime Minister Nehru said, "This dam has been built with the unrelenting toil of man for the benefit of mankind and therefore is worthy of worship. May you call it a Temple or a Gurdwara or a Mosque, it inspires our admiration and reverence". On 22 October 2013, the Government of India approved the release of a commemorative stamp to mark the 50th anniversary of the Bhakra Dam. As how successful India was at that time that it was the only dam in Asia which could produce 1500 MW power.

Also, these are multipurpose projects.

Features
The dam, at 741 ft (226 m), is one of the highest gravity dams in the world (compared to USA's largest Oroville Dam at 770 ft). The 166 km2 Gobindsagar Reservoir, named after Guru Gobind Singh, is created by this dam which is the third largest reservoir in India the first being Indira Sagar Dam and second Nagarjunasagar Dam. The river Satluj used to flow through a narrow gorge between two hills, Naina Devi ki dhar and Ramgarh ki dhar, and the site was chosen to dam the river. The large map http://www.lib.utexas.edu/maps/ams/india/nh-43-03.jpg shows the location of the original Bhakra village that was submerged in the lake formed behind the dam.

Bhakra dam was part of the larger multipurpose Bhakra Nangal Project whose aims were to prevent floods in the Satluj-Beas river valley, to provide irrigation to adjoining states and also to provide hydro-electricity. It also became a tourist spot for the tourists during later years because of its huge size and uniqueness.

It also has four spillway gates that are only used when the reservoir exceeds the maximum allowed level.

Nangal dam is a barrage dam that is 10 km downstream of Bhakra dam

Irrigation
The dam holds excess waters during the monsoon and provides a regulated release during the year. It also prevents damage due to monsoon floods. The Bhakra Canal fed by this dam provides irrigation to 10 million acres of (40,000 km2) fields in  Punjab, Haryana, and Rajasthan.

Water flows from Bhakra Dam downstream Nangal dam where it is controlled and released into Nangal Hydel Channel that later becomes Bhakra Main Line after Ganguwal and Kotla power plants. The Bhakra main line is a canal that mostly supplies irrigation water to the state of Haryana.

Electricity generation
Bhakra Dam has ten power generators with five on each side. Generators for the left power house were originally supplied by Hitachi, Japan and upgraded to the present capacity by Sumitomo, Hitachi and Andritz. Generators for the right side were originally supplied by Soviet Union and later upgraded to the present capacity by Russia. The two power houses have a total capacity of 1325 MW. The left power house contain 3 x 108 MW and  2 x 126 MW Francis turbines while the right has 5 x 157 MW.

The power generated at Bhakra Dam is distributed among partner states of Himachal Pradesh, Punjab, Haryana, Rajasthan, Chandigarh and Delhi.

Three additional power plants are on the two canals Nangal Hydel Channel and Anandpur Sahib Hydel Channel that originate from Nangal dam.  Their generation capacities are : Ganguwal - 77.65 MW, Kotla - 77.65 MW and Anandpur - 134 MW.

Fishing

The reservoir of the Dam, Gobind Sagar, homes fishes of different species including endangered Mahseer. Commercial fishing by Local fisherman is also common in Gobind Sagar.

Management
Bhakra Beas Management Board (BBMB) was constituted in 1966 for the administration, maintenance and operation of Bhakra Nangal Project from 1 October 1967. It manages the operation of both the dams. Its members are appointed by the government of India and by the states of Punjab, Haryana, Rajasthan, Himachal Pradesh, and Union territories of Delhi, and Chandigarh. Bhakra Management Board was renamed Bhakra Beas Management Board (BBMB) on 15 May 1976 to also manage dams on the river Beas. Since then the Bhakra Beas Management Board is engaged in the regulation of the supply of water and power from Bhakra Nangal Project and Beas Projects to the states of Punjab, Haryana, Rajasthan, Himachal Pradesh, Delhi, and Chandigarh government.

The Bhakra Beas Management Board regulates, operates and manages Bhakra Dam, Dehar Hydroelectric Project, Pong dam, Ganguwal and Kotla power stations.

Tourism

Being the second largest dam in India after Tehri Dam, it attracts a large number of tourists who visit its reservoir and attractive location. However, for security reasons, visitors to Bhakra-Nangal Dam has been banned since  Board (BBMB) are also run the Bhakhra Tourism Railway run on narrow gauge railway line just like Darjeeling himalayan railway, from bhakhra dam to nangal dam. There are 8 railway stations and traveling is absolutely free.

Displacement of People 
The large reservoir created by the dam displaced a large population  from the district of Bilaspur. About 371 villages were submerged. After 50 years of its completion, there is still a question of full resettlement of oustees.

See also

Dehar hydroelecric project, Pandoh dam
Koldam Dam – being constructed upstream
List of dams and reservoirs in India
Temples of modern India

Notes

External links

 , Bhakra Beas Management Board
 Site about Bhakra Nangal Dam
 Large Dams in India

Hydroelectric power stations in Himachal Pradesh
Rupnagar
Dams in Himachal Pradesh
Dams completed in 1963
Dams on the Sutlej River
Energy infrastructure completed in 1968
1963 establishments in Himachal Pradesh
Buildings and structures in Bilaspur district, Himachal Pradesh
20th-century architecture in India